Exit! It's the Way-Out Show was a British television game show aired in 1967. It was compered by disc jockey Ed Stewart with hostesses Lesley Judd and Jane Tucker and produced by Associated-Rediffusion. All 13 episodes plus the pilot are missing, believed lost.

References

External links
Exit! It's the Way-Out Show on IMDb

1967 British television series debuts
1967 British television series endings
Lost television shows
English-language television shows
1960s British game shows
ITV game shows
Black-and-white British television shows